, or  was a Japanese professional motorcycle road racer who was previously a 500 cc/MotoGP rider. He died in a road traffic crash in October 2007.

Career
When he was eleven, Abe began racing minibikes and spent his earlier career competing in motocross. He turned to road racing when he was fifteen and also competed in the United States. In 1992, Abe was the runner up in the 250 cc  category for the domestic National A championship. The following year at the All Japan Road Race Championship, Abe won the 500 cc title in the category's final year and became the youngest title winner.

In 1994, while racing in his home championship, Abe had a chance to race at the 1994 Japanese Grand Prix as a "wild card". He shocked the field by challenging for the win until three laps from the finish before falling off. Abe's performance impressed Kenny Roberts's Yamaha team, and was offered two more rides that year which yielded two sixth places and earned him a full-time Grand Prix ride for the 1995 season. This performance also so impressed a 14-year-old Valentino Rossi, that he took on the nickname "Rossifumi" and used it in his early career in deference to such a committed and spectacular racer.

Abe took his first podium finish in 1995, and his first win and fifth overall in the championship a year later. His team in 1997 was run by another former champion, Wayne Rainey, and Abe took regular points finishes over the next two seasons, including four podiums. He joined the d'Antin Antena 3 team in 1999, won at Rio de Janeiro that year, and won again at Suzuka a year later. Abe spent two seasons on less competitive machinery, yet his race results ensured his 100% record of top 10 championship finishes continued.

However, 2002 was the first year of MotoGP regulations, and Abe did not get on well with the four-stroke machinery. As such, when D'Antin switched over to the Yamaha YZR-M1 for 2003, Abe left the team and acted as a factory test rider and occasional wild card racer for Yamaha. He got another chance on the Tech3 Yamaha team for 2004, but was unsuccessful, and was moved to Yamaha's returning Superbike World Championship squad for 2005. He continued to race there in 2006 but failed to score a podium in both seasons.

In 2007, Abe competed in the All Japan Superbike Championship, again on a Yamaha.

Death
On October 7, 2007 while riding a 500 cc Yamaha T-Max scooter in Kawasaki, Kanagawa, Abe was involved in a traffic crash with a truck, which made an illegal U-turn in front of him, at 6:20 p.m. local time. He was pronounced dead two and a half hours later, at 8:50 p.m., at the hospital where he was taken for treatment.

Personal life 
His son Maiki is also a motorcycle racer who competes in All Japan Road Race Championship. He attended Yamaha VR46 Mastercamp training at Valentino Rossi's ranch in Tavullia, Italy, accompanied by his grandfather Mitsuo.

Career statistics

Grand Prix motorcycle racing

Races by year
(key) (Races in bold indicate pole position; races in italics indicate fastest lap)

References

External links 

NorickAbe.com - Official site
Norick Abe at the F1 Network
Norick Abe's funeral images at SuperbikePlanet.com

1975 births
2007 deaths
Sportspeople from Tokyo
Japanese motorcycle racers
500cc World Championship riders
Yamaha Motor Racing MotoGP riders
Superbike World Championship riders
Motorcycle road incident deaths
Road incident deaths in Japan
Tech3 MotoGP riders
MotoGP World Championship riders